Indonesian slang, or informal Indonesian language is a term that subsumes various vernacular and non-standard styles of expression used throughout Indonesia that are not necessarily mutually intelligible. Regional slang from the capital of Jakarta, based on Betawi language, is however heavily exposed and promoted in national media, and considered the de facto Indonesian slang. Despite its direct origins, Indonesian slang often differs quite significantly in both vocabulary and grammatical structure from the most standard form of Indonesia's national language. These expressions are neither standardized nor taught in any formal establishments, but rather function in daily discourse, usually in informal settings. Several dictionaries of bahasa gaul has been published. Indonesian speakers regularly mix several regional slangs in their conversations regardless of origin, but depending on the audience and the familiarity level with the listeners.

History

Its native name, bahasa gaul (the 'social language'), was a term coined in the late 1990s where bahasa means 'language' and gaul means 'social', 'cool' or 'trendy'. Similarly, the term bahasa prokem (a more outdated name for Indonesian slang) created in the early 1970s means 'the language of gangsters'. Prokem is a slang form of the word préman 'gangster' and was derived from the Dutch word vrijman, which literally means 'freeman'.

Indonesian slang is predominantly used in everyday conversation, social milieus, among popular media and, to a certain extent, in teen publications or pop culture magazines. For those living in more urbanized regions of Indonesia, Indonesian slang language often functions as the primary language medium for communication in daily life. While it would be unusual to communicate orally with people on a casual basis with very formal Indonesian, the use of proper or 'good and correct' Indonesian (bahasa Indonesia yang baik dan benar) is abundant in the media, government bodies, schools, universities, workplaces, amongst some members of the Indonesian upper-class or nobility and also in many other more formal situations.

Indonesian slang has evolved rapidly. This is, in part, due to its vocabulary that is often so different from that of standard Indonesian and Malaysian and also because so many new words (both original and foreign) are quite easily incorporated into its increasingly wide vocabulary list. However, as with any language, the constant changing of the times means that some words become rarely used or are rendered obsolete as they are considered to be outdated or no longer follow modern day trends.

Classification
At present, there is no formal classification for Indonesian slang language as it is essentially a manipulated and popularized form of the Indonesian (the national language of Indonesia).

Indonesian is part of the Western Malayo-Polynesian subgroup of the Malayo-Polynesian branch of the Austronesian languages. According to the Ethnologue, Indonesian is modelled after Riau Malay, a form of Old Malay originally spoken in Northeast Sumatra.

Geographic distribution
Indonesian slang language is mostly spoken in urban regions of the Indonesian archipelago. It also spoken in some Indonesian soap operas and animated cartoons (such as Tukang Ojek Pengkolan or Adit Sopo Jarwo). Variations of slang language can be found from city to city, mainly characterised by derivatives of the different local ethnic languages. For example, in Bandung, West Java, the local slang language contains vocabulary from the Sundanese language, while the slang found in Jakarta tends to be heavily influenced by English or the old Batavian dialect (i.e. the language of the original inhabitants of Jakarta or Batavia as it was known during the Dutch colonial period). For more information relating to the geographic distribution of Indonesian slang and regional influences, please see "Region Specific Slang" below.

Official status
Indonesian slang language is not an official language of Indonesia. However, it is a modified form of the Indonesian language and is widely used for everyday communication and in informal situations. Sometimes it is mixed with formal Indonesian in formal situations, except during state ceremonies, business meetings, and sacred prayers. A number of Indonesians sometimes speak a mixture of Indonesian slang and formal Indonesian in everyday conversation and informal situations.

Sounds
Indonesian slang generally uses the same pronunciation as standard Indonesian, although there are many influences from regional dialects on certain aspects such as accent and grammatical structure. Loan words adopted from foreign languages (especially European) such as English or Dutch are often transliterated according to the modern Indonesian orthography. For example, the word "please" is often written as plis. Another closely related phenomenon to arise in recent years is the formation of complex nouns or phrases created using a combination of English and Indonesian (slang) in the one sentence. A prime example of this is the phrase "so what gitu loh!", meaning "who cares?!" or quite simply "so what!" with added emphasis from the phrase "gitu loh". Gitu is an abbreviated form of the Indonesian word begitu meaning 'like that/such as', while loh (also spelt lho) is a particle commonly used in slang or conversational Indonesian to show surprise or instigate a warning. In these cases of combined, interlingual phrases, the original spelling (and quite often the pronunciation) of the foreign word(s) are retained. Hence, the English component of the Indonesian slang phrase "so what gitu loh!" remains relatively unchanged as far as spelling and pronunciation are concerned.

Grammar
The overall structure of Indonesian slang is not all that different from formal Indonesian, although in many cases sentences are simplified or shortened when necessary. The differences between formal and colloquial Indonesian are most evident in vocabulary and grammatical structures (e.g. affixes).

Vocabulary

The structure of the Indonesian slang language is mostly derived from formal Indonesian. However, its vocabulary is a different story altogether. Indonesian slang vocabulary is enriched by a combination of derivatives or loan words/structures from foreign languages such as Min Nan commonly referred to as Hokkien, English, and Dutch, as well as local ethnic languages such as Batavian, Sundanese, and Javanese. However, in many cases, new words are simply created at random and their origins often quite obscure.

A large proportion of the vocabulary used in Indonesian slang language was developed from formal Indonesian through several methods, most of which are listed below:
Shortening the prefix men-, me-, mem-, or meng- into n- or nge-. For example:
mengambil → ngambil 'to take' (from ambil 'to take')
menyapu → nyapu 'to sweep' (from sapu 'broom')
merasa → ngerasa 'to feel' (from rasa 'taste; feel')
membuat → ngebuat 'to make' (from buat 'to make')
Replacing the suffix -kan or -i with -in (Balinese and Betawi influence). For example:
menanyakan → nanyain 'to ask about something' (from tanya 'to ask')
diajari → diajarin 'to be taught' (from ajar 'to teach')
Using ke- at the beginning of non-volitional passive verbs instead of using ter-. For example:
tertangkap → ketangkep 'to be caught' (from tangkap 'to catch')
terpeleset → kepeleset 'to accidentally slip' (from peleset 'to miss a target')
Elimination of s or h from a word. For example:
habis → abis 'deleted, emptied'
tahu → tau 'to know'
hitung → itung 'counthitam → item 'black'hijau → ijo 'green'sudah → udah 'already'saja → aja 'just'lihat → liat 'see'
Contraction of two or more words into one word. For example:terima kasih → makasih 'thank'jaga imej → jaim 'to safeguard one's social image'percaya diri → pd or pede 'confidence'gak jelas → gaje 'not clear, absurd'males gerak → mager 'lazy' bokap-nyokap → bonyok 'parents' sange ga tertampung → sagapung or segapung 'hypersex'.ewe bo'ol → ebol 'anal intercourse (for consensual anal intercourse), sodomy (for non-consensual anal intercourse)'
For example:tangkap → tangkep 'to catch'benar → bener 'correct'pintar → pinter 'smart'malas → males 'lazy'segar → seger 'fresh'cepat → cepet 'fast'hitam → item 'black'diam → diem 'shut up'ingat → inget 'remember'sambal → sambel 'chili sauce'dekat → deket 'near'
Altering the pronunciation of i into e. For example:ingin → pengen, 'want'naik → naek 'up'kemarin → kemaren 'yesterday'baik → baek 'good'
Contracting a diphthong into a monophthong (monophthongization). For example:kalau → kalo 'if'kacau → kaco 'chaotic'galau → galo 'confusionhijau → ijo greenpakai → pake 'to use'sampai → sampe 'until'cabai → cabe 'chili'
Addition and exclusion of silent consonants and glottal stops to the beginning/end of a word, usually in speech. For example:kalo  → pake  → sampe  → 
Making of a prokem word. For example:bapak → bokap 'father'nyak → nyokap 'mother' (a special case where the consonant /k/ become /p/ to make it rhyme with bokap)jual → jokul 'to sell'berak → boker 'to defecate'sapa → sokap 'who' (sapa is a colloquial word of siapa 'who')sini → sokinReversing the phoneme or syllable order from a word. For example:
 sange → engas 'sexually aroused'
 anjing → jingan 'fuck (interjection)'
 lumayan → nayamul 'not bad'
 bego → ogeb 'stupid'
 sikat → takis 'to take something'
 selow → woles 'relax; taking easy' (from English word "slow")
 bang → ngab 'older brother; bro' (shortened form of abang 'older brother')
 mabok → kobam 'drunk'
 bisa → sabi 'can, be able to'
 yuk or yuks → kuy or skuy 'let's go, come on'
 mobil → libom 'car'
 enak → kane 'delicious'
 ribut → tubir 'chaos; fight'satu, dua, tiga → utas, aud, agit 'one, two, three' (in this context, satu or utas means a freshman in Senior High School; aud or dua means a sophomore in Senior High School; while agit or tiga means a penultimate or senior in Senior High School.

Some words are simply loaned from English. For example:
sorry → sorifriend → fren or prenswear → suerbrother → brosister → sisplease → plisslow → selowbabe → bebby the way → btw or beteweon the way → otw or otewedouble → dobeltriple → tripelsimple → simpelcheck it out → cekidotcancel → cancelSome words are also loaned from Chinese languages (mainly Hokkien and Mandarin). For example:angpau/angpao 'monetary gift' (a gift usually given during holidays or special occasions, stemmed from tradition done by Chinese community)auban 'stubborn'bo 'no; don't have' (it is often used with another descriptive noun/adjective, for example bo huat 無法 'unable', bo kam guan 'not sincerely willing to let go off somtehing')cengli 'fair, make sense'cuan 'earn, profit'hauce 'delicious, tasty'hauce sèn cin ping 'extremely/overly delicious' (the phrase is derived from Indonesian popular slang expression enak gila (from enak 'delicious' and gila 'crazy, insane'), with shén jīng bìng (神经病) literally means 'crazy, insane')ho ciak 'delicious, tasty'kepo 'busybody' (a slang from Taiwanese Hokkien, has a backronym "knowing every particular object")toke/tauke 'boss'

Some words originated from the LGBT community (especially among transvestites) usually have word ending -ong. This either come from the pattern of changing the vocal of the penult into  and replacing the rime of the ultima with -ong, or entirely different origin. This was also an attempt among LGBT community to alter the words to become more "French-sounding", thus sounding more sexy. For example:dandan → dendong 'to dress up'gede → gedong 'big'gratis → gretong 'free'homo → hemong 'homosexual'keluar → klewong 'to ejaculate' (from keluar 'to go out')laki → lekong 'male'mau → mrong 'want; sexual activity' (the meaning 'sexual activity' comes from the onomatopoeia of a cat sound (méong) during sexual intercourse) sakit → sekong 'homosexual' (from sakit 'sick')sepong 'fellatio' (from isep, colloquial form of hisap 'to suck')tempong or tembong 'anal sex' (from tembak 'to shoot' and bokong 'ass')

Many words also emerged without following the above rules at all or have their own unique history and/or origin not related to its literal meaning. For example: abg or abege 'teenager' (from anak baru gede)alay 'tacky; garish; drama queen' (from anak layangan, ; used to describe the appearance associated with lower class children often spending their time outside and getting sunburnt, but then get a broader meaning)anjay, anjir, anjrit, anjas, etc. 'wow (interjection)' (from anjing 'dog' usually used as a negative interjection, the change in its rhyme gives a slightly positive meaning)
backstreet 'to date in secret' bang jago (from abang 'older brother' and jago 'champion; master'; used to end any argument in a passive-aggressive and ad hominem manner)baper 'touchy' (from bawa perasaan )banget, from Javanese banget 'very'basian 'hangover'beud 'very' (from banget 'very'; this word has become popular after Indonesia's fast food chain, CFC coined the word on one of their television advertisement)bokep 'blue film' (from the abbreviation of "blue film", BF, which is read as bé-èf or bé-èp then transformed into a prokem word using infix -ok-)bokep 'stupid' (from the acronym of "bodoh" and "tolol")buzzeRp 'political buzzer' (a portmanteau of buzzer politik 'political buzzer' and Rupiah)cabe-cabean 'slut' (from cabe , from the abbreviation of cewek alay bisa diewe ; the term derived from teen motorbike gang/underground racing subculture where sometimes the ante was the racers' girlfriends and the winner could sleep with her)capcus 'let's go' (from cabut 'to pull off something', colloquially means 'to go'; popularized by LGBT community)cebong (a pejorative name for Joko Widodo's supporters)ciyus 'serious' (from serius 'serious')cupu 'out of date, not trendy; nerd' (from culun punya , culun 'out of date; nerd' and punya 'to have, to possess'; it became popular after Indonesia's beverage brand, Pop Ice, coined it in their television advertisement in 2007)doang from Betawi doang 'just'fafifu wasweswos or fa fi fu was wes wos 'nonsensical', 'gibberish'.gebetan 'crush' (from gebet 'to approach, to get closer to someone', itself a slang)GR or geer 'to have a prejudice about itself' (from gede rasa )garing 'lame, corny' (from garing 'dry')halo, dek or halodek, an epithet for Indonesian policeman and soldiers corps, due to their flirtatious yet creepy and perverted behaviour, such as catcalling against girls (especially doctors, pharmacists, midwives, and nurses), both online and offline.Indog (from "Indonesian dog" or "Indognesial"; a pejorative name for Indonesia and Indonesian)jamet (from jablay/janda mètal 'women who dresses and acts overly provocative but didn't care about their appearance and won't bother to take care about themselves', jajal metal 'metal poseur', or Jawa metal 'metalhead Javanese'; a pejorative name for Javanese people)jebakan betmen 'prank'jijay 'disgusting, grotesque' (from jijik 'disgusting'; sometimes used to express a condition of 'utmost disgust', used in the phrase "jijay bajay" or "anjay jijay")jomblo or jombs 'single' (from Sundanese jomblo 'unable to sell (the product); unrequited')jutek 'sassy; rude'kadrun (from kadal gurun ; a pejorative name for Islamic bigot).kenti 'penis' (from kontol 'penis')kimpoi 'sexual intercourse' (from kawin 'to have sex')kinclong 'shiny; good looking'kuproy 'construction worker' (from kuli proyek 'construction worker'; sometimes pejorative)kutu kupret 'bastard'lebay 'overacting' (from lebih 'more' with exaggerated English pronunciation imitation, or from Sumatran Malay labaih/lebaih 'excessive; crossing the line')lesbiola 'lesbian' (from lesbi 'lesbian', extended into the word les biola )maho 'gay men' (from manusia homo 'homosexual man')matre 'materialistic' (from materialistik)memek 'vagina' (from Sundanese momok 'vagina' in polite form)miapa or miapah 'really?' (from demi apa )ndakik-ndakik 'words or terminologies that too hard to understand, to the point it sounds nonsensical or gibberish.ngondek 'sissy, effeminate' (from kondektur 'public bus attendant'; describing the manner of fast speaking on announcing the destinations while doing waving gesture done by bus attendant, popularized by LGBT community)PDKT or pedekate 'hitting on someone (romantic)' (from pendekatan 'approach'; has a backronym of pede (from percaya diri 'confident') and kate 'talk')RT 6 or RT 06 (from rukun tetangga; used by Indonesian Christian apologists to describe Islam, with warga RT 6 or warga RT 06 is used to describe Muslims in general)RT 16 (used as a counter by Muslim apologists to describe Christianity, and similarly, warga RT 16 is used to describe Christians in general)segede gaban 'very big' (Gaban comes from the main protagonist of the Japanese Tokusatsu series called Space Sheriff Gavan, which become a hit in Indonesia in the 1980s, but the term itself started appearing in the 1990s when an approximately 10 meter tall statue of Gavan was erected in Jakarta's theme park, Dunia Fantasi)sekut 'afraid; cool; come on; panic' (popularized by celebrity Gofar Hilman)tajir 'filthy rich' (from )terong-terongan (from térong 'eggplant'; the male counterpart of cabé-cabéan, refer to the similarity of an elongated-shaped purple eggplant with a penis. Thus the term térong dicabéin means male to female cross-dresser)TTM or tete'em 'intimate friend' (this term hugely popularized by a Ratu music video, sometimes also associated as casual sex partner or friends with benefits) telmi 'slow-witted' (from telat mikir )T-O-P B-G-T 'cool, awesome' (from the spelling reading of top bgt, the colloquial spelling of top banget 'really cool' used in texting)Vrindavan or Prindapan (from Vrindavan, the location mentioned in Little Krishna animated series; a pejorative name for India)

Particles

Many slang particles are used in the end of a sentence. Usually, these particles do not directly change the sentence's meaning, in the sense that the truth conditions remain the same. However, they can have other effects, such as emphasizing a sentence, or suggesting hesitancy. They can be used to reinforce the social link between speaker and listener.

For example, the sentence Dia datang (she/he comes) could be modified by one of the following particles:

 Dia datang nih - used as exclamation.
 Dia datang dong - expresses certainty (She comes for sure), or sometimes obviousness (usually cheekily); dong can be stressed with a long vowel to mean She has to come.
 Dia datang kok - used to convince someone who might doubt the sentence.
 Dia datang lah - expresses a high level of certainty.
 Dia datang lho - could be translated as She comes, you know.
 Dia datang ah - expresses hesitancy; could be translated as I think she/he comes.
 Dia datang dooong - expresses hesitancy; could be translated as I wish she'd come or Please let her come Dia datang deng - used to correct what was wrong; could be translated as She came apparently Dia datang deh - used to emphasize that 'finally' the person is coming, or in different intonation and context, it is used to emphasize a condition for proposing a request, for instance in a context of: 'She will come too, so please also come with us'
 Dia datang, lagi or Dia datang pula - expresses annoyance, exasperation, or general displeasure; could be translated as She/he comes, too?Particles can also be used to introduce questions.  The following examples could both be translated as How could she come?:

 Kok, Dia datang? - used when the speaker finds the sentence difficult to believe.
 Lho? Dia datang  - indicates surprise or disbelief.

Vocabulary evolution

Pre-1980sKumpul kebo literally means 'water buffalo-style gathering' or 'gather like cattle'. It originated during the Dutch colonial era and was known as koempoel gebouw, from koempoel 'to gather' and Dutch gebouw 'building', thus the phrase means to live together under the same roof (as an unmarried couple). Confusion has caused this term to be linked with Javanese kebo 'buffalo'. This term basically means that two people in a relationship are living together without being married, i.e. in a domestic partnership or a de facto relationship. To kumpul kebo in Indonesia is considered immoral and sometimes illicit. For these reasons and also those relating to religion, Asian culture, and general ethics, it is often frowned upon in modern Indonesian society to do such a thing.

1980s
The 1980s was the era of bahasa prokem. At this time slang language vocabulary was formed by the insertion of the infix -ok-, creating a totally new word. Prokem itself is a prokem word from préman.Prokem words created by reducing the ultima, then inserting the infix -ok- before the vocal of the penult (which is now become the ultima). If the penult is an open syllable, the penult taking the nearest consonant after it as its coda. If the word is monosyllabic, the infix simply inserted before the vocal. Examples are given below, with the vocal of the penult marked with bold and the nearest consonant marked with underscore:

 ba-pak → bap → bokap 'father'
 ju-al → jul → jokul 'to sell'
 sen-di-ri → sen-dir → sendokirThe word sekolah 'school' was transformed into skokul, from skul, reminiscent of the English word "school". This word slowly become outdated and by the 1990s the word was no longer used, and changed to sekul or simply skul.

Other notable words such as mémblé 'ugly, frowning', kecé 'beautiful, good looking' (from keren cekali 'very cool'), the sentence attribute nih yé, and the exclamation "alamakjan!" all emerged in the same decade.

New Millennium
Much of the slang language created post-2000 originated from the Indonesian LGBT community. The latest method for transforming a word is to take a totally different word which differs in its ultima, rime, or coda. For example, the word mau 'want' is replaced with the word mawar 'rose'. Despite its creativity and originality, this latest form of Indonesian slang can be quite complicated to understand, even to the native Indonesians themselves. For example, "Akika tinta mawar macarena" originates from the sentence written in proper Indonesian "Aku tidak mau makan", which means 'I don't want to eat'.

The abbreviations often used to mask insult, such as kamseupay 'totally lame', abbreviation of kampungan sekali udik payah which means 'really bumpkinish, yokel, lame'.

Region specific slang

Medan slang
Medan is the capital of North Sumatra Province. Most of the slang from Medan are heavily influenced by Malay, Hokkien and Karo language. For example, "bapa" for "father", "nande" for "mother", "kedé" for "shop", "tutup lampu" for "turn off the light", "buka radio" for "turn on the radio". Another example of Medan slang is by adding "punya" at the end of the sentence. For example, "mobil aku punya" for "my car". They also have the tendency to confuse between e and é.

Jambi & Palembang slang
Jambi and Palembang slang mostly involves changing the letter at the end of the word with letter 'o'. However, not all words can be modified to include the characteristic 'o', as this rule applies mostly to words ending with the letter 'a'. Sometimes Palembang use shorter-version of word by erase first syllables, like 'segala' in standard Malay-Indonesian to 'galo'.Kito - kita (we)Galo - segala (all, every)Ngapo - kenapa (why or what happened)Jugo - Juga (too)

Another characteristic pattern of Jambi and Palembang slang involves the addition or replacement of the final letter of a word with 'k'.Pulak - pula (too, also, as well)Aek - air (water)

Another classic Malay Sumatran dialect also prevailed in most of Sumatran cities, from Palembang to Bengkulu, Jambi and Pekanbaru. These classical Malay words such as nian is used in Sumatran cities instead of sangat or banget (very).Nian - nian (classical Malay) - sangat (standard Indonesian) - banget (Indonesian slang)

Jakarta slang
Jakarta including Botabek is the capital city of Indonesia with a population of more than 20 million people. Consequently, such a huge population will undoubtedly have a role in the Jakarta slang evolution. Much of the slang evolved from the Betawi dialect.

Some prominent examples:Ajé (from 'saja') - Only, just, from the Betawi dialectAyé - I, meBacot - Talk too much.Bang (from 'abang') - Slang form of address for elder males/ brother.Banget - Very, from the Betawi dialectBégo (from 'bodoh') - Stupid, from the Betawi dialectBerapa duit? or Berapaan? - How much money/ how much is the cost?Bo'il (with a glottal stop between o and i) - CarBokap - FatherNyokap - MotherBonyok - Mother and Father combined, also a slang which means a bruise.Nggak/Gak/Ga - Not
 Cabé - chili pepper (cabai)
 Capek - Tired (lelah)
 Kebon - Garden (kebun)Nyolot - Haughty, arrogant.Doang (from 'saja')- which means only, that's allÉmangnya kenapa? - So what? / What does it matter?Gilé! (from 'gila')- An exclamation meaning crazy/insane/obscene, as emphasis to a sentence or phrase.Gua/Gué - I, Me, from the Betawi dialectJayus (from jail, usil') - Ignorant and nosy.Manyun - Someone with protruding lips, usually used to describe when someone is upset.Mécing - From English word matching which means fitting.Busèt - A form of expression which is similar to "Oh My God" or "Alas" or "Holy shit!"Lu/Lo - You, from the Betawi dialect
 Pengen - Want (ingin)
 Kondangan - Invitation (undangan), usually a wedding invitationGan/Agan - Boss, from Sundanese "juragan"Gendut or Gembrot - FatGombal - Crazy or, as another term, flirtatious wordsSinting - Insane, a freak person.Yo'i - Yes, very cool.Guga - Juga, (also)Ngenlay - Kangen, although "kangen" is slang for rindu.

The following words are taken from Hokkien (Fukkien) Chinese, and commonly used in transactions.Gocap -  IDR 50Cepek -  IDR 100Gopek -  IDR 500Seceng - IDR 1000Cenggo - IDR 1500Goceng - IDR 5000Ceban -  IDR 10.000Goban -  IDR 50.000
However, many Indonesians of non-Chinese descent do not know the meaning of the transaction words above, probably with the exception of Goceng due to its usage on KFC Indonesia's advertising on their "Goceng" products, in which all "Goceng" menus are sold at the IDR 5000 price range. Sometimes the word "perak", literally "silver", is used to describe small denominations of currency.

 Sundanese slang 
In the West Java and Banten region, the main place for Sundanese speakers, there are several words or phrases belonging to the slang language. This diversity of slang has its own peculiarities in each region in West Java Province.

Bandung slang
Bandung is the capital city of West Java province with a predominantly Sundanese culture. The Sundanese language has three levels or forms, namely: high (polite), middle class, and low (impolite). Bandung slang often uses the Low Sundanese pronouns along with the many other Sundanese translations of popular Indonesian.

Some examples:Uing (from kuring) - I/meDidieu (from di dieu, actually mean 'here') - I/meDidinya (from di dinya, actually mean 'there') - YouEuy - Sundanese particle in the end of the sentence to express excitement and surpriseDa - Sundanese particle in the end of the sentence to express certainty and emphasizes the meaning, somehow similar to Japanese "desu".O'on (from Blo'on) or Oneng (from the name of a slow witted character in Sinetron Bajaj Bajuri) - stupid, dim wittedBelegug - stupidAslina - (from word asli 'real', plus a suffix -na) which is mean 'for real'.Jangar - headache

Bogor slang
Bogor is a city in the province of West Java with the former Kingdom of Sunda Padjajaran, Bogor slang is Sundanese with its influence from Indonesian language and sometimes uses Sundanese with the word pronounced backwards.

Sukabumi slang
Sukabumi slang the language is a non-standard variety of Sundanese language that is often used in Sukabumi, West Java in the Tipar area, because Widal itself means Tipar.

This Sani or Widal language can also be called slang or slang in the Sundanese dialect, where the pronunciation of the letters in the consonants changes.

For example, the letter G becomes S, J becomes C, and 'ng' becomes 'ny' and so on.

Javanese slang
These slangs are shared across Central Java and Yogyakarta where Javanese is predominantly spoken. Like Sundanese which are spoken in Bandung, Javanese also has 3 different set of vocabularies, based on the politeness level. Common people usually talk with a mix between low-Javanese, middle-Javanese, and Indonesian. Some non-Javanese residents added their own dialects to the pot, resulting what is called the Central Java slang

Jogjakarta
Jogjakarta slang is also known as Basa Walikan, literally means  'Reverse Language' .

It is a transformation of Javanese, in which Javanese consonants are switched with one another, as shown below:
ha na ca ra ka ↔ pa dha ja ya nya
da ta sa wa la ↔ ma ga ba tha nga

With the above rules, the expletive expression Matamu! (which literally means: 'Your Eyes!') becomes Dagadu!. The following website automatically performs this transformation: Walikan Translator

Malang

Malang slang is inverted alphabetical word (mostly from Javanese and little bit from Indonesian). Commonly known in Javanese as Boso Walikan Malang (Reversed: Osob Kiwalan Ngalam. Meaning: Malang's Reversed language). The slang started appearing sometime in 1949 when the people at Malang's Gerilya Rakyat Kota (GRK meaning City People's Guerilla) needed a form of communication method that is unknown to the occupying Dutch intelligence (Both to the Dutchman, and the recruited natives) while maintaining typical daily conversation. Thus, the idea to reverse Javanese and Indonesian words was born. The goal of the creation of the language is to maintain plan secrecy, prevent leakage of information, and to confuse the enemy. At First, the language was only known amongst the guerillas. Further adding the language's purpose as an identifier whether that person is a friend or foe. But after the Dutch retreated from the city, the language remained and becoming more widespread amongst the people of Malang and its surroundings. In recent years, the technique of reversing words has become more popular nationwide and played a role in creating modern Indonesian slang. Words such as Ngab (From: Abang meaning 'Older Brother'), Sabi (From: Bisa meaning 'Be able to..' or 'Can') or Kuy (From: Yuk meaning 'Let's go') owes credit to Malang's Reversed Language.Examples:Sam = Mas (Older brother. Javanese version of 'Abang' or 'Bang')Ongis Nade= Singo Edan (the nickname of Arema Cronus F.C.)Helum= Muleh (Go home)Ublem= Mlebu (Enter)Utem= Metu (Exit)Ojob= Bojo (Husband/Wife)Oges= Sego (Rice)Rajajowas= Sawojajar (an area in Malang)Oyoborus= SuroboyoNgalam= MalangKera Ngalam= Arek Malang (lit. The kid of Malang. Referring to The People of Malang)Libom= Mobil (Car)Nawak Ewed = Kawan Dewe (Your own Friend/s)Silup= Pulis (Police (Although the Javanese word for police is the same as in Indonesian, Polisi. they altered the word slightly to make it less obvious))

Surabaya
As the second largest city in Indonesia and the capital of East Java, Surabaya uses a rougher dialect of Javanese and has a fairly complete list of its own slang. Javanese language originated from the Central Javanese farmland and by the time it reached the coastal area of East Java, it changed from its original polite form into a more impolite version with the creation or further adaptation of many new 'Javanese-style' words and swearwords. One of the most notable Surabaya slang is the word Jancok.

Pontianak slang
Pontianak slang is influenced by Malay, Teochew and Dayak and sometimes combined with Hakka. It is spoken in the Malay dialect. These slang varieties are spoken throughout West Kalimantan.

Makassarese slang
Makassarese slang is highly influenced by the native Makassarese dialect and sometimes combined with Chinese accents. The slang, in the end, sounds more informal and 'rude', as going with the tough image of Makassarese people. The possessive word for you (kamu) has three degrees of politeness:-ta (very formal and respectful), -mu (neutral), and -nu (informal). For example:This book belongs to you → Buku ini punya-ta (the - reads as a glottal stop, which makes it punya'ta. In Makassarese dialect, the apostrophe is sometimes added in written form). Buku ini punya'mu is deemed more neutral, while Buku ini punya'nu is only spoken with very close friends.

Meanwhile, the word for you itself is divided into two, the formal ki and the informal ko.

'Di mana maki (Where are you now) as opposed to informal 'Di mana moko. The -ma and -mo derives from the -mi which is often added in the end of words, having various meanings. It is hard to determine when to use mi or not, except to learn it by heart.

Ini mi? -> 'This one?'
Biarkan mi -> 'Let it go'
Ko sudah belajar mi? -> 'Have you studied?'. Ko derives from the informal Indonesian word Kau, which stands for 'you'.
Sudah dimulaimi itu ulangan? -> 'Has the exam started?', literally, 'Has-been started-the exam?'Ji is also often used in the end of words. Most often, it means 'only', or used to give a more assuring tone to a sentence.

 Sedikit ji -> 'It's only a little'
 Tidak apa-apa ji -> 'It's okay'
 Tidak susah ji soalnya -> 'The problem isn't difficult.'Di functions more like a question tag, read with a glottal stop at the end, which makes it to be 'dik'

Tidak susah ji di?? -> It's not difficult, right?

Aside from that, Makassarese more often speak with a heavier accent, mixing many of the Indonesian words with native Makassar words.Tena ku issengi apa maksudnya (or even more complicated Tena ku issengi apa massu'na ) -> Literally, "No I understand what its meaning", actually meaning, "I don't understand what it means". In places, Makassarese slangs add -i at the end of words, putting a glottal stop before that. Furthermore, the words tend to be shortened considerably, which makes -nya read as -na and words ending with -d or -t gets its ending replaced with glottal stops. Menyusut (shrinking) becomes menyusuk, and vice versa. Native Makassar people usually reads becak (pedicab) as becat''.

Gallery

See also
 Language families and languages
 Demographics of Indonesia
 British slang
 Cant (language)
 Patois
 Argot
 Slang
 Language game
 Cantonese internet slang, the similar phonemon of Indonesian slang.
 Alay

References
 Harimurti Kridalaksana (2008). Kamus Linguistik (4 ed.). Jakarta: Gramedia Pustaka Utama. .

External links

  Indonesian Slang Online Dictionary with user-contributed definitions
SEASite guide to pronunciation of Indonesian
  Pusatbahasa: Bahasa prokem
  Kitab Gaul - Kamus bahasa gaul Indonesia, cari dan temukan arti kata-kata gaul terkini
 Indonesian Slang Tutorial by Fairy
  Teen Language in Teen Literature 
 Slang Particles in Indonesian Language

Slang language, Indonesian
Slang by language